The La Selle thrush (Turdus swalesi) is a species of bird in the family Turdidae endemic to the Caribbean island of Hispaniola (split between the Dominican Republic and Haiti). A skulker of broadleaf and pine forests around 1300m, it is limited to a small and declining population in the inland Dominican Republic, as well as a relict population in Haiti.

Etymology
Its name is derived from Pic la Selle, Haiti's highest point.

Distribution
Turdus swalesi is found only on Hispaniola.  Its natural habitat is subtropical or tropical moist montane habitats.

Conservation
The La Selle thrush is threatened by habitat loss.

Behavior & call
Despite usually shy behavior, it often boldly approaches roads and other human artifacts. It only usually sings at dusk and dawn, when it is most active.

References

External links
BirdLife Species Factsheet.
La Selle Thrush - Turdus swalesi - Birds of the World

Endemic birds of the Caribbean
La Selle thrush
Birds of the Dominican Republic
Birds of Haiti 
Endemic birds of Hispaniola
La Selle thrush
Taxa named by Alexander Wetmore
Taxonomy articles created by Polbot